Paulo César Albarracín García (born 30 November 1989) is a Peruvian footballer who plays for Torneo Descentralizado club Alianza Lima.

Club career
Paulo Albarracin developed as a footballer in the popular Academia Cantolao. In January 2008 he joined Hungarian club Budapest Honvéd FC. There he made his professional debut in a league match against Újpest FC in September.

Then in January 2010 Albarracín joined his second Chalaco club Sport Boys. There he made his league debut in the Torneo Descentralizado on 28 March 2010 in matchday 7 in a derby match at home against Sporting Cristal. Manager Roberto "Titín" Drago included him in the starting eleven but later replaced him in the 87th minute for Junior Núñez as the match eventually finished in a 1–2 win for Cristal. In his ninth league game, he scored his first goal in the Descentralizado for matchday 16 by shooting into the upper right corner of Daniel Ferreyra's goal, but it was not enough as his side fell 2–1 away to José Gálvez FBC.

References

1989 births
Living people
Sportspeople from Callao
Association football midfielders
Peruvian footballers
Budapest Honvéd FC players
Sport Boys footballers
Club Alianza Lima footballers
Peruvian Primera División players
Peruvian expatriate footballers
Expatriate footballers in Hungary